Megachile temora is a species of bee in the family Megachilidae. It was described by Cameron in 1905.

References

Temora
Insects described in 1905